Park Tae-ha (also known as Pu Taixia, born 29 May 1968) is a South Korean association football coach and former player; he was formerly an assistant coach of the South Korean national team.

He played as winger and spent at his entire career with the Pohang Steelers. He managed Yanbian Fude from 2015 to 2018 before being hired to manage the Yellow/B team for China women's national football team.

International goals

External links
 
 Player Profile at Korea Football Association Official Website 

1968 births
Living people
Association football wingers
South Korean footballers
South Korea international footballers
Pohang Steelers players
K League 1 players
FC Seoul non-playing staff
Yanbian Funde F.C. managers
Expatriate football managers in China
Chinese Super League managers
South Korean expatriate football managers